The National Water and Sewerage Corporation (NWSC) is a water supply and sanitation company in Uganda. It is wholly owned by the government of Uganda.

Location
The company, as of July 2018, was in the final stages of construction of its new headquarters building at 3 Nakasero Road, on Nakasero Hill, opposite Rwenzori House. The new headquarters building was commissioned by Ruhakana Rugunda, the Prime Minister of Uganda, in July 2018.

History
NWSC was formed by Decree No. 34 in 1972 to serve the urban areas of Kampala, Entebbe, and Jinja. In 1995, NWSC was re-organized under the NWSC Statute. The company was given more authority and autonomy and the mandate to operate and provide water and sewerage services in areas entrusted to it, on a sound commercial and viable basis. As of October 2016, the following cities and towns receive services from NWSC:

Expansion plans
In 2011, NWSC began implementing a program to improve water supply to the Kampala Metropolitan Area that includes Kampala City, Wakiso District, Mukono District, Nansana, Ssabagabo, and Kira. The program, which will cost €212 million, is financed by the government of Uganda (€34 million), KfW (€20 million grant), the European Investment Bank (€75 million loan), the French Development Agency (€75 million loan), and the European Union Infrastructure Trust Fund (€8 million grant).

NWSC is planning a new water treatment plant (Katosi Water Works), in Katosi in Mukono District with the capacity to supply  of water daily. The plans also include the refurbishment of the Ggaba complex of water treatment plants (Ggaba 1, Ggaba 2 and Ggaba 3).

In December 2015, NWSC announced plans to start serving some of Uganda's rural areas. As of March 2018, NWSC offered its services in 225 Ugandan towns and planned to connect services to 12,000 villages within its service areas by 2020.

Power plant to operate Ggaba water treatment plants

In October 2014, NWSC advertised for a private partner to build, own, and operate a 7 megawatt independent power station to meet the company's energy needs at its Ggaba I, Ggaba II, and Ggaba III water treatment plants. This would lower NWSC's power bill, which stood at approximately USh 24 billion (approx. US$6.5 million) annually, accounting for 35 percent of total operating expenditure. When procured, the partner will sign a 20-year power purchase agreement with NWSC, which will have the option of selling any excess power to the national grid.

Organizational structure
NWSC has numerous divisions, each headed by a director, general manager, senior manager, or manager.

Board of directors
NWSC is governed by a five-member board of directors. Engineer Badru Kiggundu is the chairman and Engineer Silver Mugisha is the managing director and chief executive officer.

See also
Water supply and sanitation in Uganda
Katosi Water Works
Bugoloobi Wastewater Treatment Plant

References

External links
 NWSC Homepage
 Kampala Water Supply and Sanitation Expansion Programme, Uganda
 NWSC sets deadline for Ggaba water works
 NWSC To Restructure Management Team As of 20 July 2015.

Government-owned companies of Uganda
Public utilities established in 1972
1972 establishments in Uganda
Water in Uganda
Companies based in Kampala